Scolioplecta ochrophylla is a species of moth of the family Tortricidae. It is found in Australia in Queensland and the Northern Territory.

The wingspan is about 14 mm. The forewings are whitish, with dark fuscous markings, mixed with brownish ochreous. The hindwings are pale grey.

References

Moths described in 1916
Phricanthini